QPNC-PAGE, or Quantitative Preparative Native Continuous PolyAcrylamide Gel Electrophoresis, is a bioanalytical, high-resolution and highly accurate  technique applied in biochemistry and bioinorganic chemistry to separate proteins quantitatively by isoelectric point. This standardized variant of native gel electrophoresis and subset of preparative polyacrylamide gel electrophoresis is used by biologists to isolate biomacromolecules in solution, for example, active or native metalloproteins in biological samples or properly and improperly folded metal cofactor-containing proteins or protein isoforms in complex protein mixtures.

Introduction

Dr. David E. Garfin, an American biophysicist from Kensington, California, has made significant contributions to electrophoresis in both the engineering and biology communities. These include, for example, the QPNC-PAGE technique, newly developed in the early 2000s, and isoelectric focusing of proteins, which have applications in both pharmacology and medicine.

Proteins perform several functions in living organisms, including catalytic reactions and transport of molecules or ions within the cells, the organs or the whole body. The understanding of the processes in human organisms, which are mainly driven by biochemical reactions and protein-protein interactions, depends to a great extent on the ability to isolate active proteins in biological samples for more detailed examination of chemical structure and physiological function. This essential information can imply an important indication of a patient's state of health.

As about 30-40% of all known proteins contain one or more metal ion cofactors (e.g., ceruloplasmin, ferritin, amyloid-beta precursor protein, matrix metalloproteinase), especially native metalloproteins have to be isolated, identified and quantified after liquid biopsy. Many of these cofactors  (e.g., iron, copper, or zinc) play a key role in vital enzymatic catalytic processes or stabilize globular protein molecules. Therefore, the high-precision gel electrophoresis and other native separation techniques are highly relevant as initial step of protein and trace metal speciation analysis, subsequently, followed by mass spectrometric and magnetic resonance methods for quantifying and identifying the soluble proteins of interest.

Method

Separation and buffering mechanisms

 In gel electrophoresis proteins are normally separated by charge, size, or shape. The aim of isoelectric focusing (IEF), for example, is to separate proteins according to their isoelectric point (pI), thus, according to their charge at different pH values. Here, a similar mechanism is accomplished in a commercially available electrophoresis chamber (see figure Equipment) for separating charged biomolecules, for example, superoxide dismutase (SOD) or allergens, at continuous pH conditions and different velocities of migration depending on different isoelectric points. The separated (metal) proteins elute sequentially, starting with the lowest (pI > 2–4) and ending with the highest pI (pI < 10.0) of the dissolved protein molecules to be analyzed.

Due to the specific properties of the prepared gel and electrophoresis buffer solution (which is basic and contains Tris-HCl and NaN3), most proteins of a biological system (e.g., Helicobacter pylori) are charged negatively in the solution, and will migrate from the cathode to the anode due to the electric field. At the anode,  electrochemically-generated hydrogen ions react with Tris molecules to form monovalent Tris ions. The positively charged Tris ions migrate through the gel to the cathode where they neutralise hydroxide ions to form Tris molecules and water. Thus, the Tris-based buffering mechanism causes a constant pH in the continuous buffer system. At 25 °C Tris buffer has an effective pH range between 7.5 and 9.0. Under the conditions given here (addressing the concentration, buffering mechanism, pH and temperature) the effective pH is shifted in the range of about 10.0 to 10.5. Native buffer systems all have low conductivity and range in pH from 3.8 to 10.2. Continuous native buffer systems are thus used to separate proteins according their pI.

Although the pH value (10.00) of the electrophoresis buffer does not correspond to a physiological pH value within a cell or tissue type, the separated ring-shaped protein bands are eluted continuously into a physiological buffer solution (pH 8.00) and isolated in different fractions (see figure Electropherogram). Provided that irreversible denaturation cannot be demonstrated (by an independent procedure), most protein molecules are stable in aqueous solution, at pH values from 3 to 10 if the temperature is below 50 °C. As the Joule heat and temperature generated during electrophoresis may exceed 50 °C, and thus, have a negative impact on the stability and migration behavior of proteins in the gel, the separation system, including the electrophoresis chamber and a fraction collector, is cooled in a refrigerator at 4 °C. Overheating of the gel is impeded by internal cooling of the gel column as an integrated part of the electrophoresis chamber and by generating a constant power by the power supply (see figure Equipment).

Gel properties and polymerization time

Best polymerization conditions for acrylamide gels are obtained at 25-30 °C and polymerization seems terminated after 20-30 min of reaction although residual monomers (10-30%) are detected after this time. The co-polymerization of acrylamide (AA) monomer/N,N'-Methylenebisacrylamide (Bis-AA) cross-linker initiated by ammonium persulfate (APS)/tetramethylethylenediamine (TEMED) reactions, is most efficient at alkaline pH of the acrylamide solution. Thereby, acrylamide chains are created and cross-linked at a time. Due to the properties of the electrophoresis buffer, the gel polymerization is conducted at pH 10.00 making sure an efficient use of TEMED and APS as catalysts of the polymerization reaction, and concurrently, suppressing a competitive hydrolysis of the produced acrylamide polymer network. Otherwise, proteins could be modified by reaction with unpolymerized monomers of acrylamide, forming covalent acrylamide adduction products that may result in multiple bands.

Additionally, the time of polymerization of a gel may directly affect the peak-elution times of separated metalloproteins in the electropherogram due to the compression and dilatation of the gels and their pores if the incubation times for the reaction mixture used to prepare a gel are not optimized (see figure Electropherogram, cf. Reproducibility and recovery). In order to ensure maximum reproducibility in gel pore size and to obtain a fully polymerized and non-restrictive large pore gel for a PAGE run, the polyacrylamide gel is polymerized for a time period of 69 hr at room temperature (RT) in a gel column located on the casting stand. The exothermic heat generated by the polymerization processes is dissipated constantly while the temperature may rise rapidly to over 75 °C in the first minutes, after which it falls slowly. After 69 hr, the gel has reached room temperature and is in its lowest energy state, as the basic chemical reactions and gelation are complete. Gelation means that the
solvent (water) gets immobilized within the polymer network by means of hydrogen bonds and also van der Waals forces. As a result, the prepared gel is homogeneous (in terms of homogeneous  distribution  of  cross-links throughout the gel sample), inherently stable and free of monomers or radicals. Fresh polyacrylamide gels are further hydrophilic, electrically neutral and do not bind proteins. Sieving effects due to gravity-induced compression of the gel can be excluded for the same reasons. Thus, in a medium without molecular sieving properties a high-resolution can be expected.

Before an electrophoretic run is started the prepared 4% T (total polymer content (T)), 2.67% C (cross-linker concentration (C)) gel is pre-run to equilibrate it. It is essentially non-sieving and optimal for electrophoresis of proteins greater than or equal to 200 ku (cf. agarose gel electrophoresis). Proteins migrate in it more or less on the basis of their free mobility. For these reasons interactions of the gel with the biomolecules are negligibly low, and thus, the proteins separate cleanly and predictably at a polymerization time of 69 hr (see figure Electropherogram). The separated metalloproteins including biomolecules ranging from approximately < 1 ku to greater than 30 ku (e.g., metal chaperones, prions, metal transport proteins, amyloids, metalloenzymes, metallopeptides, metallothionein, phytochelatins) are not dissociated into apoproteins and metal cofactors.

Reproducibility and recovery

The bioactive structures (native or 3D conformation or shape) of the isolated protein molecules do not undergo any significant conformational changes. Thus, active metal cofactor-containing proteins can be isolated reproducibly in the same fractions after a PAGE run (see figure Electropherogram). A shifting peak in the respective electropherogram índicates that the standardized time of gel polymerization (69 hr, RT) is not implemented in a PAGE experiment. A lower deviation of the standardized polymerization time (< 69 hr) stands for incomplete polymerization, and thus, for inherent instability due to gel softening during the cross-linking of polymers as the material reaches swelling equilibrium, whereas exceeding this time limit (> 69 hr) is an indicator of gel aging. The phenomenon of gel aging is closely connected to long-term viscosity decrease of aqueous polyacrylamide solutions and increased swelling of hydrogels.

Under standard conditions, metalloproteins with different molecular mass ranges and isoelectric points have been recovered in biologically active form at a quantitative yield of more than 95%. By preparative SDS-PAGE standard proteins (cytochrome c, aldolase, ovalbumin and bovine serum albumin) with molecular masses of 14-66 ku can be recovered with an average yield of about 73,6%. Preparative isotachophoresis (ITP) is applied for isolating palladium-containing proteins with molecular masses of 362 ku (recovery: 67%) and 158 ku (recovery: 97%).

Quantification and identification

Physiological concentrations (ppb-range) of Fe, Cu, Zn, Ni, Mo, Pd, Co, Mn, Pt, Cr, Cd and other metal cofactor species can be identified and absolutely quantified in an aliquot of a fraction by inductively coupled plasma mass spectrometry (ICP-MS) or total reflection X-ray fluorescence (TXRF), for example. In case of ICP-MS the structural information of the associated metallobiomolecules is irreversibly lost due to ionization of the sample with plasma. Another established high sensitive detection method for the determination of trace elements in biological samples is graphite furnace atomic absorption spectrometry (GF-AAS) (see figure Electropherogram). Because of high purity and optimized concentration of the separated metalloproteins, for example, therapeutic recombinant plant-made pharmaceuticals such as copper chaperone for superoxide dismutase (CCS) from medicinal plants, in a few specific PAGE fractions, the related structures of these analytes can be elucidated quantitatively by using solution NMR spectroscopy under non-denaturing conditions.

Applications

Improperly folded metal proteins, for example, CCS or Cu-Zn-superoxide dismutase (SOD1) present in brain, blood or other clinical samples, are indicative of neurodegenerative diseases like Alzheimer's disease (AD) or amyotrophic lateral sclerosis (ALS). Active CCS or SOD molecules contribute to intracellular homeostatic control of essential metal ions (e.g., Cu1+/2+, Zn2+, Fe2+/3+, Mn2+, Ni3+) in organisms, and thus, these biomolecules can balance pro-oxidative and antioxidative processes in the cytoplasm. Otherwise, free (loosely bound) transition metal ions take part in Fenton-like reactions in which deleterious hydroxyl radical is formed, which unrestrained would be destructive to proteins. The loss of (active) CCS (see Figure Protein) increases the amyloid-β production in neurons which, in turn, is a major pathological hallmark of AD. Therefore, copper chaperone for superoxide dismutase is proposed to be one of the most promising biomarkers of Cu toxicity in these diseases. CCS should be analysed primarily in blood because a meta-analysis of serum data showed that AD patients have higher levels of serum Cu than healthy controls.

See also

Electrophoresis
Gel electrophoresis
Protein electrophoresis
Electroelution
Protein purification
Size-exclusion chromatography
Metallome
ICP-MS
Protein NMR spectroscopy

References

External links
Protein Purification Protocols by The Hebrew University of Jerusalem

Analytical chemistry
Electrophoresis
Laboratory techniques
Biomedicine